Kieran Longbottom (born 20 December 1985) is an Australian rugby union footballer. His regular playing position is prop. He previously played for the Western Force in Super Rugby. He made his debut during the 2008 Super 14 season against the Chiefs in Perth. On 24 June 2014, Longbottom leaves Australia to join Saracens in the English Aviva Premiership.

References

External links 
Western Force profile
itsrugby.co.uk profile

1985 births
Living people
Australian expatriate rugby union players
Australian expatriate sportspeople in England
Australian rugby union players
Expatriate rugby union players in England
Rugby union players from Perth, Western Australia
Rugby union props
Saracens F.C. players
Sportsmen from Western Australia
Western Force players
Sale Sharks players